The 1977 Grantland Rice Bowl was an NCAA Division II game following the 1977 season, between the North Dakota State Bison and the Jacksonville State Gamecocks. The game was played in Anniston, Alabama at Memorial Stadium as the Gamecocks' normal venue – Paul Snow Stadium – was being renovated. Jacksonville State defensive tackle Jesse Baker was named most valuable defensive player, and his teammate quarterback Bobby Ray Green was named most valuable offensive player. This was the last playing of the Grantland Rice Bowl, as the NCAA discontinued use of bowl names for the Division II semifinals after 1977.

Notable participants
Jacksonville State defensive tackle Jesse Baker was selected in the 1979 NFL Draft.  Baker and head coach Jim Fuller are inductees of the university's hall of fame.

North Dakota State running back Gordy Sprattler was selected in the 1979 NFL Draft, and wide receiver / kicker Mike McTague was selected in the 1979 CFL Draft. McTague and quarterback Mark Speral are inductees of the university's athletic hall of fame.

Scoring summary

References

Further reading
  (audio)

External links
 Photo of Memorial Stadium in Anniston

Grantland
Grantland Rice Bowl
Jacksonville State Gamecocks football bowl games
North Dakota State Bison football bowl games
December 1977 sports events in the United States
Grantland Rice